Port management involves the management of ports.

Larger ports 
According to a syllabus of the United Nations University:

Large ports need to deal with a number of disparate activities: the movement of ships, containers, and other cargo, the loading and unloading of ships and containers, customs activities. As well as human resources, anchorages, channels,  lighter, tugs, berths, warehouse, and other storage spaces have to be allocated and released. The efficient management of a port involves managing these activities and resources, managing the flows of money involved between the agents providing and using these resources, and providing management information.

Smaller ports

See also
American Association of Port Authorities
Port authority
Port security

References

Ports and harbours
Ship management